Budapest Honvéd Football Club is a professional football club based in Budapest, Hungary.

Overall record

Overall record
Accurate as of 28 August 2020

Legend: GF = Goals For. GA = Goals Against. GD = Goal Difference.

Matches

References

External links

Budapest Honvéd FC
Hungarian football clubs in international competitions